Sherrod Gideon (born February 21, 1977) is a former American and Canadian football wide receiver. He played college football at Southern Mississippi. He was drafted in the 6th round (200th overall) in the 2000 NFL draft by the New Orleans Saints, he was the first player picked after Tom Brady.

Early years and college
Gideon was born in Greenwood, Mississippi and attended Greenwood High School.

Gideon attended college at Southern Mississippi. In 1996, he appeared in 11 games, recording 33 receptions for 500 yards and one touchdown. In 1997, he appeared in 12 games, recording 53 reception for 1,008 yards and nine touchdowns. He also returned 33 punts for 347 yards. That season the Golden Eagles defeated the Pittsburgh Panthers, 41-7 in Liberty Bowl with Gideon being named the game's MVP. For the season, he finished 1st in Conference USA in receiving yards and yards-per-reception (18.7). In 1998, he appeared in 11 games, recording 66 receptions for 1,186 for 13 touchdowns. He also returned five punts for 33 yards. He also finished 1st in C-USA with receiving touchdowns. After the season, he was named College Football News and College Sporting News All-America honorable mention. In 1999, he appeared in eight games, recording 40 receptions for 520 yards and seven touchdowns. He also returned six punts for 41 yards.

For his career he recorded 193 receptions for 3,214 yards and 30 touchdowns. His 1,186 receiving yards in 1998 stands as the Southern Mississippi single-season receiving yardage record.

In 2004, Gideon was named to Conference USA's first All-Decade team.

Professional career

2000 NFL Draft

National Football League
Gideon was selected in the sixth round (200th overall) in the 2000 NFL draft by the New Orleans Saints. He spent time in 2000, on the practice squad of the Miami Dolphins.
On October 2, 2001, the St. Louis Rams signed Gideon to the team's practice squad.

On February 8, 2002, he was signed by the Houston Texans. He was released on September 18.

Canadian Football League
In 2003, Gideon appeared in 13 games for the Ottawa Renegades. For the season he caught 34 passes for 503 yards and four touchdowns. He was 1-of-1 for 10 yards passing, he ran the ball one time for one yard. In 2004, he appeared in 10 games. He recorded 10 receptions for 181 yards.

On June 9, 2005 Gideon was released by the BC Lions.

Coaching career
In 2009, Gideon joined Leflore County High School as the football team's offensive coordinator. In June 2011, he was named LeFlore's head coach.

References

Living people
1977 births
American football wide receivers
Canadian football wide receivers
American players of Canadian football
Southern Miss Golden Eagles football players
New Orleans Saints players
St. Louis Rams players
Houston Texans players
Ottawa Renegades players
BC Lions players
High school football coaches in Mississippi
Players of American football from Mississippi
People from Greenwood, Mississippi